Peter Hobbs (January 19, 1918 – January 2, 2011) was a French-born American character actor, known for roles on Broadway, television and film.

Early life, education and military service
Hobbs was born in Étretat, France, to Dr. Austin L. Hobbs and Mabel Foote Hobbs. However, he was raised in New York City. Hobbs attended Solebury School in Bucks County, Pennsylvania, and received his bachelor's degree from Bard College in Annandale-on-Hudson, New York. He served in as sergeant in combat engineering during World War II and fought at the Battle of the Bulge.

Career
Hobbs made two guest appearances on Perry Mason including the role of defendant Gregory Pelham in the 1964 episode, "The Case of the Careless Kidnapper." and the role of James Hyatt in the 1965 episode, "The Case of the Cheating Chancellor." He also had appearances and recurring roles on Barney Miller, Lou Grant, The Odd Couple, The Doris Day Show, The Facts of Life, Knots Landing, The F.B.I., and The Tim Conway Show. Hobbs played Peter Ames on the CBS daytime series The Secret Storm from 1954 to 1962.

His film credits included roles in The Girl Who Knew Too Much (1969), The Andromeda Strain (1971), The Steagle (1971), Sleeper (1973), The Lady in Red (1979), Loving Couples (1980), Any Which Way You Can (1980), Beyond Witch Mountain (1982), The Man with Two Brains (1983) and Nickel Mountain (1984).

Death
Hobbs died at his home in Santa Monica, California, on January 2, 2011 at age 92 following a brief illness. He was survived by his wife, Carolyn Adams Hobbs, three daughters, two stepsons, six grandchildren and two great-grandchildren.

Filmography

Lost Boundaries (1949) - Eddie Clark (uncredited)
The Killers (1964) - Instructor
The New Interns (1964) - Dr. Duane
Good Neighbor Sam (1964) - Phil Reisner
The F.B.I. (1966-1968, TV series)
Daddy's Gone A-Hunting (1969) - Cathy's Doctor (uncredited)
The Girl Who Knew Too Much (1969) - Robert Farwell
The Andromeda Strain (1971) - General Sparks
The Steagle (1971) - Dr. Payne
Star Spangled Girl (1971) - Man in Car
The Odd Couple - 4 episodes (1972-1975, TV series)
Heavy Traffic (1973) - (voice)
Sleeper (1973) - Dr. Dean
The Nine Lives of Fritz the Cat (1974) - (voice)
Death Sentence (1974) - Judge
Wizards (1977) - General (voice)
Barney Miller - 6 episodes (1977-1980, TV series)
Lou Grant - 4 episodes (1977-1981, TV series)
The Lady in Red (1979) - Pops Geissler
The Two Worlds of Jennie Logan (1979)
Diff'rent Strokes (1979-1985, TV series)
Loving Couples (1980) - Frank
Any Which Way You Can (1980) - Motel Clerk
9 to 5 (1980) - Doctor at St. Ambrose Hospital
Knots Landing - 4 episodes (1981-1984, TV series)
The Incredible Hulk (1981) - Dr. Hart
Beyond Witch Mountain (1982) - Dr. Peter Morton
Hart to Hart (1983, TV Series) as Ben Alden - season 3, episode 3
The Man with Two Brains (1983) - Dr. Brandon
The Dukes of Hazzard (1983) - Emerson P. Craig
Nickel Mountain (1984) - Dr. Costard
The Next One (1984) - Barnaby
Hunter (1986, TV series) - season 2, episode 14
In the Mood (1987) - The Judge
Hot to Trot (1988) - Veterinarian

References

External links

1918 births
2011 deaths
French emigrants to the United States
American male stage actors
American male film actors
American male television actors
Bard College alumni
Male actors from Santa Monica, California
Male actors from New York City
United States Army personnel of World War II
United States Army soldiers